Minthi (before 1927: Άλβενα - Alvena) is a mountain village and a community in the municipality of Zacharo, Elis, Greece. In 2011 its population was 77 for the village and 86 for the community, including the village Kotroni. It is situated at 760 m elevation on the northern slope of the mountain Minthi (after which it was named), 5 km south of Platiana, 12 km west of Andritsaina and 10 km east of Zacharo. The area of the community is 16,500 hectares.

Population

History
The oldest mention of the village was the participation of its residents in the Ottoman–Venetian War (1463–1479), in which its leaders were Mitros Alveniotis and Giannis Agrios. In a Venetian census, between 1689 and 1700, it had 42 families and 149 residents. Minthi suffered damage from the 2007 Greek forest fires.

See also

List of settlements in Elis

References

External links
Minthi at the GTP Travel Pages

Zacharo
Populated places in Elis